The men's 200 metre breaststroke competition of the swimming events at the 2012 European Aquatics Championships took place May 23 and 24. The heats and semifinals took place on May 23, the final on May 24.

Records
Prior to the competition, the existing world, European and championship records were as follows.

Results

Heats
40 swimmers participated in 5 heats.

Semifinals
The eight fasters swimmers advanced to the final.

Semifinal 1

Semifinal 2

Final
The final was held at 17:41.

References

Men's 200 m breaststroke